The 1997 FIBA European Championship, commonly called FIBA EuroBasket 1997, was the 30th FIBA EuroBasket regional basketball championship held by FIBA Europe, which also served as Europe qualifier for the 1998 FIBA World Championship, giving a berth to the top four (or five, depending on Greece reaching one of the top four places) teams in the final standings. It was held in Spain between 24 June and 6 July 1997. Sixteen national teams entered the event under the auspices of FIBA Europe, the sport's regional governing body. The cities of Badalona, Barcelona and Girona hosted the tournament. FR Yugoslavia won its seventh FIBA European title by defeating Italy with a 61–49 score in the final. Yugoslavia's Saša Đorđević was voted the tournament's MVP.

Venues

Qualification

Squads

Format
The teams were split in four groups of four teams each where they played a round robin. The top three teams from each group advance to the second stage.
In the second stage, two groups of six teams were formed and played a round robin. The results between teams that faced during the preliminary round are carried over. The top four teams from each group in the second stage advance to the knockout quarterfinals to compete for the Championship. The winners in the semifinals compete for the European Championship, while the losers from the semifinals play a consolation game for the third place.
The losers in the quarterfinals compete in a separate bracket to define 5th through 8th place in the final standings.
The four teams eliminated in the second stage compete in another bracket to define 9th through 12th place in the final standings.
The four teams eliminated in the preliminary round compete in another bracket to define 13th through 16th place in the final standings.

Preliminary round

Times given below are in Central European Summer Time (UTC+2).

Group A

|}

Group B

|}

Group C

|}

Group D

|}

Second round

Group E

|}

Group F

|}

Knockout stage

Championship bracket

Quarterfinals

Semifinals

Third place

Final

5th to 8th place

9th to 12th place

13th to 16th place

Statistical leaders

Individual Tournament Highs

Points

Rebounds

Assists

Steals

Minutes

Individual Game Highs

Team Tournament Highs

Offensive PPG

Rebounds

Assists

Steals

Team Game highs

Awards

Final standings

References

External links
 1997 European Championship for Men archive.FIBA.com

1997
1996–97 in Spanish basketball
1996–97 in European basketball
International basketball competitions hosted by Spain
International basketball competitions hosted by Catalonia